The siege of Gaeta of 1815 was a three-month siege of the city of Gaeta by Austrian forces during the Neapolitan War.

Siege
The Neapolitan garrison was commanded by Maresciallo di Campo Alessandro Begani, general of the deposed King of Naples Gioacchino Murat, while the Austrians were commanded by Joseph Freiherr von Lauer. The Austrians were reinforced by the ships of the Royal Navy. On 8 August 1815 the city capitulated, marking the official end of the war.

Aftermath
The defenders were forced to capitulate due to the lack of food and for the diseases that raged in the troops. For the surrender, General Begani obtained honorable conditions.

Notes

References

External links

Conflicts in 1815
Battles of the Neapolitan War
Battles in Lazio
Sieges involving Austria
Sieges involving the Kingdom of Naples
Sieges involving the United Kingdom
1815 in Italy
May 1815 events
June 1815 events
July 1815 events
August 1815 events